A person is a being, such as a human, that has certain capacities or attributes constituting personhood.

Person or Persons may also refer to:

 Dramatis personae, the characters in a play or other written work
 Persona, a social role, or a character played by an actor
 Person (grammar), person as a grammatical category
 Person (law), person as a legal category
 Person (Catholic canon law), person as a category in Catholic canon law
 Person (theology), person as a theological category
 Human, person as a human individual
 Person (surname)
 Persons (surname)
 Person Colby Cheney (1828–1901), American paper manufacturer, abolitionist, and politician
 Person County, North Carolina, U.S.

See also
 Personal (disambiguation)